This is a list of notable inventors.

Alphabetical list

A
 Vitaly Abalakov (1906–1986), Russia – camming devices, Abalakov thread (or V-thread), gearless ice climbing anchor
 Ernst Karl Abbe (1840–1905), Germany – Condenser (microscope), apochromatic lens, refractometer
 Hovannes Adamian (1879–1932), USSR/Russia/Armenia – tricolor principle of the color television
 Samuel W. Alderson (1914–2005), U.S. – Crash test dummy
 Alexandre Alexeieff (1901–1982), Russia/France – Pinscreen animation (with his wife Claire Parker)
 Rostislav Alexeyev (1916–1980), Russia/USSR – Ekranoplan
 Randi Altschul (born 1960), U.S. – Disposable cellphone
 Bruce Ames (born 1928), U.S. – Ames test (Cell biology)
 Giovanni Battista Amici (1786–1863), Italy – Dipleidoscope, Amici prism
 Ruth Amos (born 1989), UK – StairSteady
 Mary Anderson (1866–1953), U.S. – windshield wiper blade
 Momofuku Ando (1910–2007), Japan – Instant noodles
 Hal Anger (1920–2005), U.S. – Well counter (radioactivity measurements), gamma camera
 Anders Knutsson Ångström (1888–1981), Sweden – Pyranometer
 Ottomar Anschütz (1846–1907), Germany – single-curtain focal-plane shutter, electrotachyscope
 Hermann Anschütz-Kaempfe (1872–1931), Germany – Gyrocompass
 Virginia Apgar (1909–1974), U.S. – Apgar score (for newborn babies)
 Nicolas Appert (1749–1841), France – canning (food preservation) using glass bottles, see also Peter Durand
 Archimedes (c. 287–212 BC), Greece – Archimedes' screw
 Guido of Arezzo (c. 991–c. 1033), Italy – Guidonian notation, see musical notation and also staff (music)
 Ami Argand (1750–1803), France – Argand lamp
 William George Armstrong (1810–1900), UK – hydraulic accumulator
 Neil Arnott (1788–1874), UK – waterbed
 Joseph Aspdin (1788–1855), UK – Portland cement
 John Vincent Atanasoff (1903–1995), Bulgaria/U.S. – electronic digital computer
 Marcel Audiffren, France – refrigeration, patent

B
 Boris Babayan (born 1933), Armenia/USSR/Russia - superscalar computer
 Charles Babbage (1791–1871), UK – Analytical engine (semi-automatic)
 Tabitha Babbit (1779–1853), U.S. – Saw mill circular saw
 Victor Babeș (1854–1926), Romania – Babesia, the founder of serum therapy
 Leo Baekeland (1863–1944), Belgian–American – Velox photographic paper and Bakelite
 Ralph H. Baer (1922–2014), German born American – video game console
 Adolf von Baeyer (1835–1917), Germany – Fluorescein, synthetic Indigo dye, Phenolphthalein
 John Logie Baird (1888–1946), Scotland – World's first working television, 26 January 1926 and electronic colour television
 Abi Bakr of Isfahan (c. 1235), Persia/Iran – mechanical geared astrolabe with lunisolar calendar
 George Ballas (1925–2011), U.S. – String trimmer
 Frederick Banting (1891–1941), Canada – Insulin
 Vladimir Baranov-Rossine (1888–1944), Russia/France – Optophonic Piano
 John Barber (1734–1801), UK – gas turbine
 John Bardeen (1908–1991), U.S. – co-inventor of the transistor, with Brattain and Schockley
 Vladimir Barmin (1909–1993), Russia – first rocket launch complex (spaceport)
 Anthony R. Barringer (1925–2009), Canada/U.S. – INPUT (Induced Pulse Transient) airborne electromagnetic system
 Earl W. Bascom (1906–1995), Canada/U.S. – rodeo bucking chute (1916 and 1919), rodeo bronc saddle (1922), rodeo bareback rigging (1924), rodeo riding chaps (1926)
 Nikolay Basov (1922–2001), Russia – co-inventor of laser and maser
 Patricia Bath (1942–2019), U.S. - inventor of laser cataract surgery
 Émile Baudot (1845–1903), France – Baudot code
 Eugen Baumann (1846–1896), Germany – PVC
 Trevor Baylis (1937–2018), UK – a wind-up radio
 Maria Beasley (1847–1904), U.S. – barrel-hooping machine, improved life raft
 Francis Beaufort (1774–1857), Ireland/UK – Beaufort scale, Beaufort cipher
 Hans Beck (1929–2009), Germany – inventor of Playmobil toys
 Arnold O. Beckman (1900–2004), U.S. – electric pH meter
 Vladimir Bekhterev (1857–1927), Russia – Bekhterev's Mixture
 Josip Belušić (1847–1905), Croatia – electric speedometer
 Michael Bell (born 1938), together with Melanie Chartoff (born 1950), U.S. – a gray water recycling device for reuse of shower and sink water in the home
 Alexander Graham Bell (1847–1922), UK, Canada, and U.S. – telephone
 Nikolay Benardos (1842–1905), Russian Empire – arc welding (specifically carbon arc welding, the first arc welding method)
 Ruth R. Benerito (1916–2013), U.S. – Permanent press (no-iron clothing)
 Miriam Benjamin (1861–1947), Washington, D.C. – Gong and signal chair (adopted by House of Representatives and precursor to flight attendant signal system)
 William R. Bennett Jr. (1930–2008), together with Ali Javan (1926–2016), U.S./Iran – Gas laser (Helium-Neon)
 Melitta Bentz (1873–1950), Germany – paper Coffee filter
 Karl Benz (1844–1929), Germany – the petrol-powered automobile
 Hans Berger (1873–1941), Germany – first human EEG and its development
 Friedrich Bergius (1884–1949), Germany – Bergius process (synthetic fuel from coal)
 Emile Berliner (1851–1929), Germany and U.S. – the disc record gramophone
 Tim Berners-Lee (born 1955), UK – with Robert Cailliau, the World Wide Web
 Marcellin Berthelot (1827–1907), France – Berthelot's reagent (chemistry)
 Heinrich Bertsch (1897–1981), Germany – first fully synthetic laundry detergent "Fewa" (chemistry)
 Charles Best (1899–1978), Canada – Insulin (chemistry)
 Max Bielschowsky (1869–1940), Germany – Bielschowsky stain (histology)
 Alfred Binet (1857–1911), France – with his student Théodore Simon (1872–1961), first practical Intelligence test
 Lucio Bini (1908–1964), together with Ugo Cerletti (1877–1963), Italy – Electroconvulsive therapy
 Gerd Binnig (born 1947), with Christoph Gerber, Calvin Quate and Heinrich Rohrer, Germany/Switzerland/U.S. – Atomic force microscope and Scanning tunneling microscope
 Clarence Birdseye (1886–1956), U.S. – Flash freezing
 László Bíró (1899–1985), Hungary – Ballpoint pen
 Thor Bjørklund (1889–1975), Norway – Cheese slicer
 J. Stuart Blackton (1875–1941), U.S. – Stop-motion film
 Otto Blathy (1860–1939), Hungary – co-inventor of the transformer, wattmeter, alternating current (AC) and turbogenerator
 John Blenkinsop (1783–1831), UK – Blenkinsop rack railway system
 Charles K. Bliss (1897–1985), Austro-Hungary/Australia – Blissymbols
 Katharine Burr Blodgett (1898–1979), U.S. – nonreflective glass
 Alan Blumlein (1903–1942), UK – stereo
 David Boggs (1950–2022), U.S. – Ethernet
 Nils Bohlin (1920–2002), Sweden – the three-point seat belt
 Sarah Boone (1832–1908), U.S. – improved ironing board design
 Charlie Booth (1903–2008), Australia – Starting blocks
 Sam Born (1891–1959), Russia/U.S. – lollipop-making machine
 Jagdish Chandra Bose (1858–1937), India – Crescograph
 Matthew Piers Watt Boulton (1820–1894), UK – aileron
 Seth Boyden (1788–1870), U.S. – nail-making machine
 Herbert Boyer (born 1936), together with Paul Berg (1926–2023), and Stanley Norman Cohen (1935–), U.S. – created first Genetically modified organism
 Willard Boyle (1924–2011) together with George E. Smith (born 1930), U.S. – Charge-coupled device (CCD)
 Hugh Bradner (1915–2008), U.S. – Wetsuit
 Louis Braille (1809–1852), France – Braille writing system, Braille musical notation
 Archie Brain (born 1942), UK - Laryngeal mask 
 Jacques E. Brandenberger (1872–1954), Switzerland – Cellophane
 Édouard Branly (1844–1940), France – Coherer
 Charles F. Brannock (1903–1992), U.S. – Brannock Device (shoe size)
 Walter Houser Brattain (1902–1987), U.S.– co-inventor of the transistor
 Karl Ferdinand Braun (1850–1918), Germany – cathode-ray tube oscilloscope
 Stanislav Brebera (1925–2012), Czech Republic – Semtex explosive
 David Brewster (1781–1868), UK – Kaleidoscope
 Charles B. Brooks (1865–?), U.S. - first self-propelled street sweeping truck
 Rachel Fuller Brown (1898–1980), U.S. – Nystatin, the world's first antifungal antibiotic
 William C. Brown (1916–1999), U.S. – Crossed-field amplifier
 Marie Van Brittan Brown (1922–1999), U.S. – home security system
 Friedrich Wilhelm Gustav Bruhn (1853–1927), Germany – Taximeter
 Nikolay Brusentsov (1925–2014), USSR, Russia – ternary computer (Setun)
 Dudley Allen Buck (1927–1959), U.S. – Cryotron, content-addressable memory
 Edwin Beard Budding (1795–1846), UK – lawnmower
 Gersh Budker (1918–1977), Russia – electron cooling, co-inventor of collider
 Edward Bull (1759–1798), England – Bull engine (a modified steam engine)
 Robert Bunsen (1811–1899), Germany – Bunsen burner
 Henry Burden (1791–1871), Scotland and U.S. – Horseshoe machine, first usable iron railroad spike

C

 Ve Elizabeth Cadie (1893–1956), U.S. – heat insulating handle for small home appliances

 Herminie Cadolle (1845–1926), France – modern brassiere

 Robert Cailliau (born 1947), Belgium – with Tim Berners-Lee, the World Wide Web
 Edward A. Calahan (1838–1912), U.S. – Stock ticker tape
 Nicholas Callan (1799–1864), Ireland – Induction coil
 Spéranza Calo-Séailles (1885–1949), Greece – "Lap" decorative concrete
 Alan Archibald Campbell-Swinton (1863–1930), Scotland – Television
 Tullio Campagnolo (1901–1983), Italy – Quick release skewer
 Charles Cantor (born 1942), U.S. – Pulsed-field gel electrophoresis (molecular biology)
 Mario Ramberg Capecchi (born 1937), together with Sir Martin John Evans (born 1941), and Oliver Smithies (1925–2017), U.S. – Gene targeting
 Roxey Ann Caplin (1793–1888), UK – Victorian-style corset
 Arturo Caprotti (1881–1938), Italy – Caprotti valve gear
 Gerolamo Cardano (1501–1576), Italy – Cardan grille (cryptography)
 Philip Cardew (1851–1910), UK – Hot-wire galvanometer
 Chester Carlson (1906–1968), U.S. – Xerographic copier
 Wallace Carothers (1896–1937), U.S. – Nylon and Neoprene (together with Arnold Collins)
 Antonio Benedetto Carpano (1764–1815), Italy – Vermouth
 Mary P. Carpenter (1840–1900), U.S. – mosquito nets, mosquito traps
 Giovanni Caselli (1815–1891), Italy/France – Pantelegraph
 George Cayley (1773–1857), UK – tension-spoke wheels
 Anders Celsius (1701–1744), Sweden – Celsius temperature scale
 Vint Cerf (born 1943), together with Bob Kahn (1938–), U.S. – Internet Protocol (IP)
 Ugo Cerletti (1877–1963), together with Lucio Bini (1908–1964), Italy – Electroconvulsive therapy
 Leona Chalmers (fl 1937), U.S. – modern menstrual cup
 Charles Chamberland (1851–1908), France – Chamberland filter
 Min Chueh Chang (1908–1991), together with Gregory Goodwin Pincus (1903–1967), U.S./China – Combined oral contraceptive pill
 Thomas Chang (born 1933), Canada/China – Artificial cell
 Emmett Chapman (1936–2021), U.S. – Chapman Stick
 Claude Chappe (1763–1805), France – Semaphore line
 Melanie Chartoff (born 1950), together with Michael Bell (born 1938), U.S. – a gray water recycling device for reuse of shower and sink water in the home
 David Chaum (born 1955), U.S. – Digital signatures, ecash
 Vladimir Chelomey (1914–1984), USSR – First space station (Salyut)
 Joyce Chen (1917–1994), China – stir fry pan
 Pavel Cherenkov (1904–1990), USSR – Cherenkov detector
 Evgeniy Chertovsky (1902-?), Russia – pressure suit
 Alicia Chong Rodriguez - American engineer and inventor
 Ward Christensen (born 1945), U.S. – Bulletin board system
 Ole Kirk Christiansen (1891–1958), Denmark – Creator of Lego
 Samuel Hunter Christie (1784–1865), UK – Wheatstone bridge
 Juan de la Cierva (1895–1936), Spain – the autogyro
 Charles Clagget (1740–1795), UK – Improvements for musical instruments
 Leland Clark (1918–2005), U.S. – Clark electrode (medicine)
 Georges Claude (1870–1960), France – neon lamp
 Adelaide Claxton (fl 1860s–1890s), UK – ear caps
 Madame Clicquot Ponsardin (1777–1866), France – Champagne riddling
 Henri Marie Coandă (1886–1972), Romania – Coandă effect
 Josephine Cochrane (1839–1913), U.S. – dishwasher
 Christopher Cockerell (1910–1999), UK – Hovercraft
 Aeneas Coffey (1780–1852), Ireland – Coffey still
 Sir Henry Cole (1808–1882), UK – Christmas card
 Samuel Colt (1814–1862), U.S. – Revolver development
 Sir William Congreve (1772–1828), UK – Congreve rocket
 George Constantinescu (1881–1965), Romania – creator of the theory of sonics, a new branch of continuum mechanics
 Albert Coons (1912–1978), U.S. – Immunofluorescence (microscopy)
 Martin Cooper (born 1928), U.S. – Mobile phone
 Harry Coover (1917–2011), U.S. – Super Glue
 Lloyd Groff Copeman (1865–1956), U.S. – Electric stove
 Cornelis Corneliszoon (1550–1607), The Netherlands – wind powered sawmill
 Alexander Coucoulas (born 1933), U.S. – Thermosonic bonding
 Wallace H. Coulter (1913–1998), U.S. – Coulter principle
 Jacques Cousteau (1910–1997), France – co-inventor of the aqualung and the Nikonos underwater camera
 John "Jack" Higson Cover Jr. (1920–2009), U.S. – Taser
 William Crookes (1832–1919), UK – Crookes radiometer, Crookes tube
 Bartolomeo Cristofori (1655–1731), Italy – piano
 Caresse Crosby (1891–1970), U.S. - Modern bra 
 S. Scott Crump (inv. c. 1989), U.S. – fused deposition modeling
 Nicolas-Joseph Cugnot (1725–1804), France – first steam-powered road vehicle
 William Cullen (1710–1790), UK – first artificial refrigerator
 Rose Cumming (1887–1968), U.S. – metallic wallpaper
 Emily Cummins (born 1987), UK – sustainable refrigerator, water carrier, toothpaste dispenser
 Marie Curie (1867–1934), Poland –  portable X-ray units ("Little Curies"), radium-emanation needles
 Jamie Lee Curtis (born 1958), U.S. – diapers
 Jan Czochralski (1885–1953), Poland / Germany – Czochralski process (crystal growth)

D
 Nils Gustaf Dalén (1869–1937), Sweden – AGA cooker, Dalén light, Agamassan, Sun valve for lighthouses and buoys
 John Frederic Daniell (1790–1845), UK – Daniell cell
 Corradino D'Ascanio (1891–1981), Italy – Vespa scooter
 Leonardo da Vinci (1452–1519), Italy – helicopter, tanks, and parachutes for safety
 Raymond Damadian (1936–2022), Armenia/U.S. - Magnetic resonance imaging (MRI)
 Robert Davidson (1804-1894), Scotland - electric  locomotive
 Jacob Davis (1868–1908), U.S. – Riveted jeans
 Humphry Davy (1778–1829), UK – Davy miners lamp
 Joseph Day (1855–1946), UK – the crankcase-compression two-stroke engine
 Lee de Forest (1873–1961), U.S. – Phonofilm, triode
 Fe del Mundo (1911–2011), Philippines – non-electric incubator
 Yuri Nikolaevich Denisyuk (1927–2006), Russia – 3D holography
 Robert H. Dennard (born 1932), U.S. – Dynamic random-access memory (DRAM)
 Miksa Déri (1854–1938), Hungary – co-inventor of an improved closed-core transformer
 Robert DeStefano (born 1962), U.S. - exercise equipment
 James Dewar (1842–1923), UK – Thermos flask
 Aleksandr Dianin (1851–1918), Russia – Bisphenol A, Dianin's compound
 William Kennedy Laurie Dickson (1860–1935), UK – motion picture camera
 Philip Diehl (1847–1913), U.S. – Ceiling fan
 Rudolf Diesel (1858–1913), Germany – Diesel engine
 William H. Dobelle (1943–2004), U.S. – Dobelle Eye
 Johann Wolfgang Döbereiner (1780–1849), Germany – Döbereiner's lamp (chemistry)
 Toshitada Doi (born 1943), Japan, together with Joop Sinjou, Netherlands – Compact disc
 Ray Dolby (1933–2013), U.S. – Dolby noise-reduction system
 Mikhail Dolivo-Dobrovolsky (1862–1919), Poland/Russia – three-phase electric power
 Marion O'Brien Donovan (1917–1998), U.S. – Waterproof diaper
 Hub van Doorne (1900–1979), Netherlands, Variomatic continuously variable transmission
 John Thompson Dorrance (1873–1930), U.S. – Condensed soup
 Amanda Minnie Douglas (1831–1916), writer and inventor (portable folding mosquito net frame)
 Charles Dow (1851–1902), U.S. – Dow Jones Industrial Average
 Mulalo Doyoyo (born 1970), South Africa/U.S. – Cenocell – cementless concrete
 Anastase Dragomir (1896–1966), Romania – Ejection seat
 Karl Drais (1785–1851), Germany – dandy horse, Draisine
 Richard Drew (1899–1980), U.S. – Masking tape
 John Boyd Dunlop (1840–1921), UK – first practical pneumatic tyre
 Cyril Duquet (1841–1922), Canada – Telephone handset
 Alexey Dushkin (1904–1977), Russia – deep column station
 James Dyson (born 1947), UK – Dual Cyclone bagless vacuum cleaner, incorporating the principles of cyclonic separation.

E
 George Eastman (1854–1932), U.S. – roll film
 J. Presper Eckert (1919–1995), U.S. – ENIAC – the first general purpose programmable digital computer
 Thomas Alva Edison (1847–1931), U.S. – phonograph, commercially practical incandescent light bulb, etc.
 Pehr Victor Edman (1916–1977), Sweden – Edman degradation for Protein sequencing
 Sir Robert Geoffrey Edwards (1925–2013), UK – In vitro fertilisation
 Ellen Eglin (1849–c. 1890), U.S. – Clothes wringer
 Brendan Eich (born 1961), U.S. – JavaScript (programming language)
 Willem Einthoven (1860–1927), The Netherlands – the electrocardiogram
 Benjamin Eisenstadt (1906–1996), U.S. – Sugar packet
 Paul Eisler (1907–1992), Austria/U.S. – Printed circuit board (electronics)
 Giorgi Eliava (1892–1937), together with Félix d'Herelle (1873–1949), France / Georgia – Phage therapy
 Ivan Elmanov, Russia – first monorail (horse-drawn)
 Rune Elmqvist (1906–1996), Sweden – implantable pacemaker
 John Haven Emerson (1906–1997), U.S. – iron lung
 Douglas Engelbart (1925–2013), U.S. – the computer mouse
 John Ericsson (1803–1889), Sweden – the two screw-propeller
 Emil Erlenmeyer (1825–1909), Germany – Erlenmeyer flask
 Sir Martin John Evans (born 1941), together with Mario Ramberg Capecchi (born 1937), and Oliver Smithies (1925–2017), U.S. – Knockout mouse, Gene targeting
 Ole Evinrude (1877–1934), Norway – outboard motor

F
 Charles Fabry (1867–1945), together with Alfred Perot (1863–1925), France – Fabry–Pérot interferometer (physics)
 Samuel Face (1923–2001), U.S. – concrete flatness/levelness technology; Lightning Switch
 Federico Faggin (born 1941), Italy – microprocessor
 Daniel Gabriel Fahrenheit (1686–1736), The Netherlands – Fahrenheit temperature scale, Mercury-in-glass thermometer
 Michael Faraday (1791–1867), UK – electric transformer, electric motor
 Johann Maria Farina (1685–1766), Germany; Eau de Cologne
 Myra Juliet Farrell (1878–1957), Australia – stitchless button, Press stud
 Philo Farnsworth (1906–1971), U.S. – electronic television
 Marga Faulstich (1915–1998), Germany – optical glass, lightweight lens SF 64
 Muhammad al-Fazari (died 796/806), Persia – astrolabe
 John Bennett Fenn (1917–2010), U.S. – Electrospray ionization
 Henry John Horstman Fenton (1854–1929), UK – Fenton's reagent (chemistry)
 James Fergason (1934–2008), U.S. – improved liquid crystal display
 Enrico Fermi (1901–1954), Italy – nuclear reactor
 Humberto Fernández-Morán (1924–1999), Venezuela – Diamond scalpel, Ultra microtome
 Michele Ferrero (1925–2015), Italy – Kinder Surprise = Kinder Eggs, Nutella
 Bran Ferren (born 1953), U.S. – Pinch-to-zoom (multi-touch), together with Daniel Hillis
 Reginald Fessenden (1866–1932), Canada – two-way radio
 Robert Feulgen (1884–1955), Germany – Feulgen stain (histology)
 Adolf Gaston Eugen Fick (1829–1901), Germany – contact lens
 Ethel Finck (1932–2003), U.S. – cardiac catheter
 Abbas Ibn Firnas (810–887), Al-Andalus – fused quartz and silica glass, metronome
 Artur Fischer (1919–2016) Germany – fasteners including fischertechnik.
 Franz Joseph Emil Fischer (1877–1947), together with Hans Schrader (1921–2012), Germany – Fischer assay (oil yield test)
 Franz Joseph Emil Fischer (1877–1947), together with Hans Tropsch (1889–1935), Germany – Fischer–Tropsch process (refinery process)
 Gerhard Fischer (1899–1988), Germany/U.S. – hand-held metal detector
 Paul C. Fisher (1913–2006), U.S. – Space Pen
 Edith M. Flanigen (born 1929), U.S. – zeolite Y, molecular sieve
 Alexander Fleming (1881–1955), Scotland – Penicillin
 John Ambrose Fleming (1848–1945), UK – Vacuum diode
 Sandford Fleming (1827–1915), Canada – Universal Standard Time
 Nicolas Florine (1891–1972), Georgia/Russia/Belgium – first tandem rotor helicopter to fly freely
 Tommy Flowers (1905–1998), UK – Colossus an early electronic computer.
 Irmgard Flügge-Lotz (1903–1974), U.S. – aircraft guidance systems
 Thomas J. Fogarty (born 1934), U.S. – Embolectomy catheter (medicine)
Larry Fondren, U.S. - entrepreneur, inventor and credit markets expert
Eunice Newton Foote (1819–1888), U.S.  – greenhouse effect, boot soles
 Enrico Forlanini (1848–1930), Italy – Steam helicopter, hydrofoil, Forlanini airships
 Eric Fossum (born 1957), U.S. – intra-pixel charge transfer in CMOS image sensors
 Josephine G. Fountain (fl 1960), U.S.  – direct suction tracheotomy tube
 Jean Bernard Léon Foucault (1819–1868), France – Foucault pendulum, gyroscope, eddy current
 Benoît Fourneyron (1802–1867), France – water turbine
 John Fowler (1826–1864), UK – steam-driven ploughing engine
 Benjamin Franklin (1706–1790), U.S. – the pointed lightning rod conductor, bifocal glasses, the Franklin stove, the glass harmonica
 Herman Frasch (1851–1914), Germany / U.S. – Frasch process (petrochemistry), Paraffin wax purification
 Ian Hector Frazer (born 1953), together with Jian Zhou (1957–1999), U.S./China – HPV vaccine against cervical cancer
 Helen Murray Free (1923–2021), U.S. – diabetes tests
 Augustin-Jean Fresnel (1788–1827), France – Fresnel lens
 Amelia Freund (1824–1887), Germany – cooking stove contained a "frizzler" which fried without hardening.
 Ida Freund (1863–1914), UK – gas measuring tube, periodic table cupcakes
 William Friese-Greene (1855–1921), UK – cinematography
 Julius Fromm (1883–1945), Germany – first seamless Condom
 Arthur Fry (born 1931), U.S. – Post-it note
 Buckminster Fuller (1895–1983), U.S. – geodesic dome
 C. W. Fuller (inv. 1953), U.S. – Gilhoolie
 Robert Fulton (1765–1815), United States – first commercially successful steamboat, first practical submarine
 Ivan Fyodorov (c. 1510–1583), Russia/Poland–Lithuania – invented multibarreled mortar, introduced printing in Russia
 Svyatoslav Fyodorov (1927–2000), Russia – radial keratotomy
 Vladimir Fyodorov (1874–1966), Russia – Fedorov Avtomat (first self-loading battle rifle, arguably the first assault rifle)

G
 Dennis Gabor (1900–1979), Hungarian-British – holography
 Boris Borisovich Galitzine (1862–1916), Russia – electromagnetic seismograph
 Joseph G. Gall (born 1928), U.S. – In situ hybridization (cell biology)
 Alfred William Gallagher (1911–1990), New Zealand – Electric fence for farmers
 Dmitri Garbuzov (1940–2006), Russia/U.S. – continuous-wave-operating diode lasers (together with Zhores Alferov), high-power diode lasers
 Elmer R. Gates (1859–1923), U.S. – foam fire extinguisher, electric loom mechanisms, magnetic & diamagnetic separators, educational toy ("box & blocks")*
 Richard J. Gatling (1818–1903), U.S. – wheat drill, first successful machine gun
 Georgy Gause (1910–1986), Russia – gramicidin S, neomycin, lincomycin and other antibiotics
 E. K. Gauzen, Russia – three bolt equipment (early diving costume)
 Norman Gaylord (1923–2007), U.S. – rigid gas-permeable contact lens
 Karl-Hermann Geib (1908–1949), Germany / USSR – Girdler sulfide process
 Hans Wilhelm Geiger (1882–1945), Germany – Geiger counter
 Andrey Geim (born 1958), Russia/United Kingdom – graphene
 Nestor Genko (1839–1904), Russia – Genko's Forest Belt (the first large-scale windbreak system)
 Christoph Gerber (1942–), with Calvin Quate (1923–2019), and with Gerd Binnig (1947–), Germany/U.S./Switzerland – Atomic force microscope
 Friedrich Clemens Gerke (1801–1888), Germany – current international Morse code
 David Gestetner (1854–1939), Austria-Hungary / UK – Gestetner copier
 Alberto Gianni (1891–1930), Italy – Torretta butoscopica
 John Heysham Gibbon (1903–1973), U.S. – Heart-lung machine
 Gustav Giemsa (1867–1948), Germany – Giemsa stain (histology)
 Adolph Giesl-Gieslingen (1903–1992), Austria – Giesl ejector
 Henri Giffard (1825–1882), France – powered airship, injector
 David J. Gingery (1932–2004), USA
 Donald A. Glaser (1926–2013), U.S. – Bubble chamber
 Joseph Glass (1791–1867), England – chimney-sweeping apparatus
 Valentyn Glushko (1908–1989), Russia – hypergolic propellant, electric propulsion, Soviet rocket engines (including world's most powerful liquid-fuel rocket engine RD-170)
 Heinrich Göbel (1818–1893), Germany –  incandescent lamp
 Leonid Gobyato (1875–1915), Russia – man-portable mortar
 Robert Goddard (1882–1945), U.S. – liquid fuel rocket
 Sam Golden (1915–1997), together with Leonard Bocour (1910–1993), U.S. – Acrylic paint
 Peter Carl Goldmark (1906–1977), Hungary – vinyl record (LP), CBS color television
 Camillo Golgi (1843–1926), Italy – Golgi's method (histology)
 György Gömöri (1904–1957), Hungary / U.S. – Gömöri trichrome stain, Gömöri methenamine silver stain (histology)
 Lewis Gompertz (—1861), UK – expanding chuck, improved velocipede
 Sarah E. Goode (1855–1905), US – cabinet bed. First African-American woman to receive a United States patent.
 Charles Goodyear (1800–1860), U.S. – vulcanization of rubber
 Praveen Kumar Gorakavi (born 1989), India – low-cost Braille Typewriter
 Robert W. Gore (1937–2020), U.S. – Gore-Tex
 Igor Gorynin (1926–2015), Russia – weldable titanium alloys, high strength aluminium alloys, radiation-hardened steels
 James Gosling (born 1955), U.S. – Java (programming language)
 Gordon Gould (1920–2005), U.S. – Laser, see also Theodore Maiman
 Richard Hall Gower (1768–1833), UK – ship's hull and rigging
 Boris Grabovsky (1901–1966), Russia – cathode commutator, an early electronic TV pickup tube
 Bette Nesmith Graham (1924–1980), U.S. – Correction fluid, Liquid Paper
 Iréne Grahn  (1945–2013), Sweden – finger joint support for patients with rheumatoid arthritis
 Hans Christian Gram (1853–1938), Denmark / Germany – Gram staining (histology)
 Zénobe Gramme (1826–1901), Belgium/France – Gramme dynamo
 Temple Grandin (born 1947), Inventor of the squeeze machine and humane abattoirs.
 Michael Grätzel (born 1944), Germany/Switzerland– Dye-sensitized solar cell
 James Henry Greathead (1844–1896), South Africa – tunnel boring machine, tunnelling shield technique
 Chester Greenwood (1858–1937), U.S. – thermal earmuffs
 Lori Greiner (born 1969), U.S. – Silver Safekeeper anti-tarnish lining (jewelry organizers) and multiple consumer products, 120 US and foreign patents
 James Gregory (1638–1675), Scotland – Gregorian telescope
 William Griggs (1832–1911), England – a process of photolithography
 William Robert Grove (1811–1896), Wales – fuel cell
 Gustav Guanella (1909–1982), Switzerland – DSSS, Guanella-Balun
 Otto von Guericke (1602–1686), Germany – vacuum pump, manometer, dasymeter
 Mikhail Gurevich (1893–1976), Russia – MiG-series fighter aircraft, including world's most produced jet aircraft MiG-15 and most produced supersonic aircraft MiG-21 (together with Artem Mikoyan)
 Goldsworthy Gurney (1793–1875), England – Gurney Stove
 Bartolomeu de Gusmão (1685–1724), Brazil – early air balloons
 Johann Gutenberg (c. 1398–1468), Germany – movable type printing press
 Samuel Guthrie (physician) (1782–1848), U.S. – discovered chloroform

H
 Fritz Haber (1868–1934), Germany – Haber process (ammonia synthesis)
 John Hadley (1682–1744), UK – Octant
 Waldemar Haffkine (1860–1930), Russia/Switzerland – first anti-cholera and anti-plague vaccines
 Gunther von Hagens (born 1945), Germany – whole body Plastination
 Charles Hall (1863–1914), U.S. – aluminum production
 Robert N. Hall (1919–2016), U.S. – Semiconductor laser
 Samuel Hall (1782–1863), UK – condenser to enable recycling of water in ship's  steam engine
 Tracy Hall (1919–2008), U.S. – synthetic diamond
 Nicholas Halse (died 1636), England – malt kiln
 Richard Hamming (1915–1998), U.S. – Hamming code
 John Hays Hammond Jr. (1888–1965), U.S. – radio control
 Ruth Handler (1916–2002), U.S. – Barbie doll
 James Hargreaves (1720–1778), UK – spinning jenny
 John Harington (1561–1612), UK – the flush toilet
 William Snow Harris (1791–1867), UK – much improved naval Lightning rods
 John Harrison (1693–1776), UK – marine chronometer
 Ross Granville Harrison (1870–1959), U.S. – first successful animal Tissue culture, Cell culture
 Kazuo Hashimoto (died 1995), Japan – Caller-ID, answering machine
 Victor Hasselblad (1906–1978), Sweden – invented the 6 x 6 cm single-lens reflex camera
 Ibn al-Haytham (Alhazen) (965–1039), Iraq – camera obscura, pinhole camera, magnifying glass
 George H. Heilmeier (1936–2014), U.S. – liquid crystal display (LCD)
 Henry Heimlich (1920–2016), U.S. – Heimlich maneuver
 Robert A. Heinlein (1907–1988), U.S. – waterbed
 Jozef Karol Hell (1713–1789), Slovakia – the water pillar
 Rudolf Hell (1901–2002), Germany – the Hellschreiber
 Hermann von Helmholtz (1821–1894), Germany – Helmholtz pitch notation, Helmholtz resonator, ophthalmoscope
 Zhang Heng (78–139), China – Seismometer, first hydraulic-powered armillary sphere
 Beulah Louise Henry (1887–1973), U.S. – bobbin-free sewing machine, vacuum ice cream freezer
 Charles H. Henry (1937-2016), U.S. – Quantum well laser
 Joseph Henry (1797–1878), Scotland/U.S. – electromagnetic relay
 Félix d'Herelle (1873–1949), together with Giorgi Eliava (1892–1937), France,Georgia – Phage therapy
 Heron (c. 10–70), Roman Egypt – usually credited with invention of the aeolipile, although it may have been described a century earlier
 John Herschel (1792–1871), UK – photographic fixer (hypo), actinometer
 Harry Houdini (1874–1926) U.S. – flight time illusion
 Heinrich Hertz (1857–1894), Germany – radio telegraphy, electromagnetic radiation
 Ephraim Hertzano (1912–1987), Roumania / Israel – Rummikub
 Lasse Hessel (1940–2019), Denmark – Female condom
 George de Hevesy (1885–1966), Hungary – radioactive tracer
 Ronald Price Hickman (1932–2011), U.S. – designed the original Lotus Elan, the Lotus Elan +2 and the Lotus Europa, as well as the Black & Decker Workmate
 Rowland Hill (1795–1879), UK – postage stamp
 Maurice Hilleman (1919–2005) – vaccines against childhood diseases
 Tanaka Hisashige (1799–1881), Japan – Myriad year clock
 Ted Hoff (born 1937), U.S. – microprocessor
 Felix Hoffmann (Bayer) (1868–1949), Germany – Aspirin
 Albert Hofmann (1906–2008), Switzerland – LSD
 Kotaro Honda (1870–1954), Japan – KS steel
 Huang Hongjia (1924–2021), China – Single-mode optical fiber.
 Herman Hollerith (1860–1929), U.S. – recording data on a machine readable medium, tabulator, punched cards
 Nick Holonyak (born 1928), U.S. – LED (Light Emitting Diode)
 Norman Holter (1914–1983), U.S. – Holter monitor
 Robert Hooke (1635–1703), UK – balance wheel, iris diaphragm, acoustic telephone
 Erna Schneider Hoover (born 1926), U.S. – computerized telephone switching system
 Harold Hopkins (1918–1994), UK – zoom lens, rod lens endoscope
 Grace Murray Hopper (1906–1992), U.S. – Compiler
 Frank Hornby (1863–1936), UK – invented Meccano
 Jimmy Hotz (born 1953), U.S. – Hotz MIDI Translator, Atari Hotz Box
 Royal Earl House (1814–1895), U.S. – first Printing telegraph
 Coenraad Johannes van Houten (1801–1887), Netherlands – cocoa powder, cacao butter, chocolate milk
 Elias Howe (1819–1867), U.S. – sewing machine
 David Edward Hughes (1831–1900), UK – printing telegraph
 Chuck Hull (born 1939), U.S. – 3D printer
 Troy Hurtubise (1963–2018), Canada – Trojan Ballistics Suit of Armor, Ursus suit, Firepaste, Angel Light
 Miller Reese Hutchison (1876–1944), U.S. – Klaxon, electric hearing aid
 Christiaan Huygens (1629–1695), Netherlands – pendulum clock
 John Wesley Hyatt (1837–1920), U.S. – celluloid manufacturing

I
 Gavriil Ilizarov (1921–1992), Russia – Ilizarov apparatus, external fixation, distraction osteogenesis
 Mamoru Imura (born 1948), Japan – RFIQin (automatic cooking device)
 Daisuke Inoue (born 1940), Japan – Karaoke machine
 János Irinyi (1817–1895), Hungary – noiseless match
 Ub Iwerks (1901–1971), U. S. – Multiplane camera for animation

J
 Moritz von Jacobi (1801–1874), Germany/Russia – electrotyping, electric boat
 Rudolf Jaenisch (born 1942), Germany/U.S. – first Genetically modified mouse
 Alcinous Burton Jamison (1851–1938), American physician, inventor of medical devices
 Karl Guthe Jansky (1905–1950), U.S. – radio telescope
 Karl Jatho (1873–1933), Germany – aeroplane
 Ali Javan (1926–2016), together with William R. Bennett Jr. (1930–2008), Iran/U.S. – Gas laser (Helium-Neon)
 Al-Jazari (1136–1206), Iraq – crank-driven and hydropowered saqiya chain pump, crank-driven screw and screwpump, elephant clock, weight-driven clock, weight-driven pump, reciprocating piston suction pump, geared and hydropowered water supply system, programmable humanoid robots, robotics, hand washing automata, flush mechanism, lamination, static balancing, paper model, sand casting, molding sand, intermittency, linkage
 Ibn Al-Jazzar (Algizar) (895–979), Tunisia – sexual dysfunction and erectile dysfunction treatment drugs
 Ányos Jedlik (1800–1898), Hungary – Jedlik dynamo
 Alec John Jeffreys (born 1950), UK – DNA profiling (forensics)
 Charles Francis Jenkins (1867–1934), U.S. – television and movie projector (Phantoscope)
 Thomas L. Jennings (1791–1859), U.S. – novel method of dry cleaning
 Steve Jobs (1955–2011), U.S. – Apple Macintosh computer, iPod, iPhone, iPad and other devices, software operating systems and applications.
 Amos Edward Joel Jr. (1918–2008) U.S. – electrical engineer, known for several contributions and over seventy patents related to telecommunications switching systems
 Carl Edvard Johansson (1864–1943), Sweden – Gauge blocks
 Johan Petter Johansson (1853–1943), Sweden – Pipe wrench and adjustable spanner
 Reynold B. Johnson (1906–1998), U.S. – Hard disk drive
 Philipp von Jolly (1809–1884), Germany – Jolly balance
 Scott A. Jones (born 1960), U.S. – created one of the most successful versions of voicemail as well as ChaCha Search, a human-assisted internet search engine
 Tom Parry Jones (1935–2013), UK – first electronic Breathalyzer
 Assen Jordanoff (1896–1967), Bulgaria – airbag
 Marc Jorgenson, Canada, engineer, inventor and musician
 Anatol Josepho (1894–1980), patented the first coin-operated photo booth called the "Photomaton" in 1925.
 Marjorie Joyner (1896–1994), U.S. – Permanent wave machine
 Whitcomb Judson (1836–1909), U.S. – zipper
 Percy Lavon Julian (1899–1975), U.S. – chemical synthesis of medicinal drugs from plants
 Ma Jun (fl. 220–265), China – south-pointing chariot (see differential gear), mechanical puppet theater, chain pumps, improved silk looms

K
 Mikhail Kalashnikov (1919–2013), Russia – AK-47 and AK-74 assault rifles (the most produced ever)
 Bob Kahn (born 1938), together with Vint Cerf (born 1943), U.S. – Internet Protocol (TCP/IP)
 Dawon Kahng (1931–1992), South Korea, together with Simon Sze (born 1936), Taiwan/U.S. – Floating-gate MOSFET
 Dean Kamen (born 1951), U.S. – Invented the Segway HT scooter and the IBOT Mobility Device
 Heike Kamerlingh Onnes (1853–1926), Netherlands – liquid helium
 Nikolay Kamov (1902–1973), Russia – armored battle autogyro, Ka-series coaxial rotor helicopters
 Pyotr Kapitsa (1894–1984), Russia – first ultrastrong magnetic field creating techniques, basic low-temperature physics inventions
 Georgii Karpechenko (1899–1941), Russia – rabbage (the first ever non-sterile hybrid obtained through the crossbreeding)
 Jamshīd al-Kāshī (c. 1380–1429), Persia/Iran – plate of conjunctions, analog planetary computer
 Andrew Kay (1919–2014), U.S. – Digital voltmeter
 Adolphe Kégresse (1879–1943), France/Russia – Kégresse track (first half-track and first off-road vehicle with continuous track), dual-clutch transmission
 Carl D. Keith (1920–2008), together with John J. Mooney (1930–2020), U.S. – three way catalytic converter
 Mstislav Keldysh (1911–1978), Latvia/Russia – co-developer of Sputnik 1 (the first artificial satellite) together with Korolyov and Tikhonravov
 John Harvey Kellogg (1852–1943), cornflake breakfasts
 John G. Kemeny (1926–1992), together with Thomas E. Kurtz (born 1928), Hungary/U.S. – BASIC (programming language)
 Alexander Kemurdzhian (1921–2003), Armenia/Russia – first space exploration rover (Lunokhod)
 Mary Kenner (1912–2006), U.S. – sanitary belt
 William Saville-Kent (1845–1908), UK/Australia – Pearl culture, see also Mikimoto Kōkichi
 Kerim Kerimov (1917–2003), Azerbaijan and Russia – co-developer of human spaceflight, space dock, space station
 Jacques de Kervor (1928-2010), French industrial designer
 Charles F. Kettering (1876–1958), U.S. – invented automobile self-starter ignition, Freon ethyl gasoline and more
 Fazlur Khan (1929–1982), Bangladesh – structural systems for high-rise skyscrapers
 Yulii Khariton (1904–1996), Russia – chief designer of the Soviet atomic bomb, co-developer of the Tsar Bomba
 Anatoly Kharlampiyev (1906–1979), Russia – Sambo (martial art)
 Al-Khazini (fl.1115–1130), Persia/Iran – hydrostatic balance
 Konstantin Khrenov (1894–1984), Russia – underwater welding
 Abu-Mahmud Khojandi (c. 940–1000), Persia/Iran – astronomical sextant
 Muhammad ibn Musa al-Khwarizmi (Algoritmi) (c. 780–850), Persia/Iran – modern algebra, mural instrument, horary quadrant, Sine quadrant, shadow square
 Johann Kiefuss – inventor in Nuremberg in 1517
 Marcel Kiepach (1894–1915), Croatia – dynamo, maritime compass that indicates north regardless of the presence of iron or magnetic forces
 Erhard Kietz (1909–1982), Germany & U.S. – signal improvements for video transmissions
 Jack Kilby (1923–2005), U.S. – patented the first integrated circuit
 Al-Kindi (Alkindus) (801–873), Iraq/Yemen – unambiguously described the distillation of wine in the 9th century, cryptanalysis, frequency analysis
 Petrus Jacobus Kipp (1808–1864), The Netherlands – Kipp's apparatus (chemistry)
 Steve Kirsch (born 1956), U.S. – Optical mouse
 Fritz Klatte (1880–1934), Germany – vinyl chloride, forerunner to polyvinyl chloride
 Yves Klein (1928–1962), France – International Klein Blue
 Margaret E. Knight (1838–1914), U.S. – machine that completely constructs box-bottom brown paper bags
 Tom Knight (? – ), U.S. – BioBricks (synthetic biology)
 Ivan Knunyants (1906–1990), Armenia/Russia – capron, Nylon 6, polyamide-6
 Robert Koch (1843–1910), Germany – method for culturing bacteria on solid media
 Willem Johan Kolff (1911–2009), Netherlands – artificial kidney hemodialysis machine
 Rudolf Kompfner (1909–1977), U.S. – Traveling-wave tube
 Konstantin Konstantinov (1817/1819–1871), Russia –  device for measuring flight speed of projectiles, ballistic rocket pendulum, launch pad, rocket-making machine
 Sergei Korolev (1907–1966), USSR – first successful intercontinental ballistic missile (R-7 Semyorka), R-7 rocket family, Sputniks (including the first Earth-orbiting artificial satellite), Vostok program (including the first human spaceflight)
 Nikolai Korotkov (1874–1920), Russian Empire – auscultatory technique for blood pressure measurement
 Semyon Korsakov (1787–1853), Russian Empire – punched card for information storage
 Mikhail Koshkin (1898–1940), Russia – T-34 medium tank, the best and most produced tank of World War II
 Ognjeslav Kostović (1851–1916), Serbia/Russia – arborite (high-strength plywood, an early plastic)
 Gleb Kotelnikov (1872–1944), Russia – knapsack parachute, drogue parachute
 William Justin Kroll (1889–1973), Luxemburg/U.S. – Kroll process
 Alfred Krupa (1915-1989), Yugoslavia – the modern wheeled suitcase, a glass-bottom boat, the skis for use in walking on water, a folding canvas catamaran
 Aleksey Krylov (1863–1945), Russia – gyroscopic damping of ships
 Ivan Kulibin (1735–1818), Russia – egg-shaped clock, candle searchlight, elevator using screw mechanisms, a self-rolling carriage featuring a flywheel, brake, gear box, and bearing, an early optical telegraph
 Shen Kuo (1031–1095), China – improved gnomon, armillary sphere, clepsydra, and sighting tube
 Igor Kurchatov (1903–1960), Russia – first nuclear power plant, first nuclear reactors for submarines and surface ships
 Thomas E. Kurtz (born 1928), together with John G. Kemeny (1926–1992), U.S./Hungary – BASIC (programming language)
 Raymond Kurzweil (born 1948), Optical character recognition; flatbed scanner
 Ken Kutaragi (born 1950), Japan – PlayStation
 Stephanie Kwolek (1923–2014), U.S. – Kevlar
 John Howard Kyan (1774–1850), Ireland – The process of Kyanization used for wood preservation

L
 Dmitry Lachinov (1842–1902), Russia – mercury pump, economizer for electricity consumption, electrical insulation tester, optical dynamometer, photometer, electrolyser
 René Laennec (1781–1826), France – stethoscope
 Georges Lakhovsky (1869–1942), Russia/U.S. – Multiple Wave Oscillator
 Hedy Lamarr (1914–2000), Austria and U.S. – Spread spectrum radio
 Edwin H. Land (1909–1991), U.S. – Polaroid polarizing filters and the Land Camera
 Samuel P. Langley (1834–1906), U.S. – bolometer
 Alexander Nikolayevich Lodygin (1847–1923), Russia – incandescent lamp
 Irving Langmuir (1851–1957), U.S. – gas filled incandescent light bulb, hydrogen welding
 Norm Larsen (1923–1970), U.S. – WD-40
 Lewis Latimer (1848–1928), U.S. – improved carbon-filament light bulb
 Gustav de Laval (1845–1913), Sweden – invented the milk separator and the milking machine
 Semyon Lavochkin (1900–1960), Russia – La-series aircraft, first operational surface-to-air missile S-25 Berkut
 John Bennet Lawes (1814–1900), UK – superphosphate or chemical fertilizer
 Ernest Orlando Lawrence (1901–1958), U.S. – Cyclotron
 Nikolai Lebedenko, Russia – Tsar Tank, the largest armored vehicle in history
 Sergei Lebedev (1874–1934), Russia – commercially viable synthetic rubber
 William Lee (1563–1614), UK – Stocking frame knitting machine
 Edward Leedskalnin (1887–1951), U.S. – construction techniques used to single-handedly lift massive coral blocks in the creation of his Coral Castle
 Antoni van Leeuwenhoek (1632–1723), The Netherlands – development of the microscope
 Jerome H. Lemelson (1923–1997), U.S. – Inventions in the fields in which he patented make possible, wholly or in part, innovations like automated warehouses, industrial robots, cordless telephones, fax machines, videocassette recorders, camcorders, and the magnetic tape drive used in Sony's Walkman tape players.
 Jean-Joseph Etienne Lenoir (1822–1900), Belgium – internal combustion engine, motorboat
 Giacomo da Lentini (13th century), Italy – Sonnet
 R. G. LeTourneau (1888–1969), U.S. – electric wheel, motor scraper, mobile oil drilling platform, bulldozer, cable control unit for scrapers
 Rasmus Lerdorf (born 1968), Greenland/Canada – PHP (programming language)
 Willard Frank Libby (1908–1980), U.S. – radiocarbon dating
 Justus von Liebig (1803–1873), Germany – nitrogen-based fertilizer
 Hon Lik (born 1951), China – electronic cigarette
 Otto Lilienthal (1848–1896), Germany – hang glider
 Lin Yutang (1895–1976), China/U.S. – Chinese language typewriter
 Charles Lindbergh (1902–1974), U.S. – organ perfusion pump
 Frans Wilhelm Lindqvist (1862–1931), Sweden – Kerosene stove operated by compressed air
 Carl Linnaeus (1707–1778), Sweden – formal Binomial nomenclature for living organisms, Horologium Florae
 Hans Lippershey (1570–1619), The Netherlands – associated with the appearance of the telescope
 Jonas Ferdinand Gabriel Lippmann (1845–1921), France – Lippmann plate, Integral imaging, Lippmann electrometer
 Lisitsyn brothers, Ivan Fyodorovich and Nazar Fyodorovich, Russia – samovar (the first documented makers)
 William Howard Livens (1889–1964), UK – chemical warfare – Livens Projector
 Eduard Locher (1840–1910), Switzerland – Locher rack railway system
 Fredrik Ljungström (1875–1964) and Birger Ljungström (1872–1948), Sweden - Ljungström turbine, Ljungström air preheater, Ljungström method
 Alexander Lodygin (1847–1923), Russia – electrical filament, incandescent light bulb with tungsten filament
 Louis Lombard-Gérin (1848-1918), France - trolleybus
 Mikhail Lomonosov (1711–1765), Russia – night vision telescope, off-axis reflecting telescope, coaxial rotor, re-invented smalt
 Yury Lomonosov (1876–1952), Russia/UK – first successful mainline diesel locomotive
 Aleksandr Loran (1849 – after 1911), Russia – fire fighting foam, foam extinguisher
 Oleg Losev (1903–1942), Russia – light-emitting diode, crystadine
 Antoine Louis (1723–1792), France – Guillotine
 Archibald Low (1882–1956), UK – Pioneer of radio guidance systems
 Ed Lowe (1920–1995), U.S. – Cat litter
 Gleb Lozino-Lozinskiy (1909–2001), Russia – Buran (spacecraft), Spiral project
 Ignacy Łukasiewicz (1822–1882), Poland – Kerosene lamp
 Auguste and Louis Lumière (1862–1954 and 1864–1948), France – Cinématographe
 Cai Lun, 蔡倫 (50–121), China – paper
 Giovanni Luppis or Ivan Vukić (1813–1875), Austrian Empire (ethnical Croatian, from Rijeka) – self-propelled torpedo
 Richard F. Lyon (born 1952), U.S. – Optical mouse
 Arkhip Lyulka (1908–1984), Russia – first double jet turbofan engine, other Soviet aircraft engines

M
 Charles Macintosh (1766–1843), Scotland – waterproof raincoat, life vest
 Theodore Maiman (1927–2007), U.S. – Laser, see also Gordon Gould
 Ahmed Majan (born 1963), UAE – instrumented racehorse saddle and others
 Aleksandr Makarov (born 1966), Russia/Germany – Orbitrap mass spectrometer
 Stepan Makarov (1849–1904), Russia – Icebreaker Yermak, the first true icebreaker able to ride over and crush pack ice
 Victor Makeev (1924–1985), Russia – first submarine-launched ballistic missile
 Nestor Makhno (1888–1934), Ukraine/Russia – tachanka
 Dmitri Dmitrievich Maksutov (1896–1964), Russia – Maksutov telescope
 Annie Malone (1869–1957), U.S. – Cosmetics for African American women
 Sergey Malyutin (1859–1937), Russia – designed the first matryoshka doll (together with Vasily Zvyozdochkin)
 Al-Ma'mun (786–833), Iraq – singing bird automata, terrestrial globe
 Boris Mamyrin (1919–2007), Russia – reflectron (ion mirror)
 George William Manby (1765–1854), UK – Fire extinguisher
 Harry Mendell US - invented the first digital sampling synthesizer
 Joy Mangano (born 1956), U.S. – household appliances
 Anna Mangin (1844-1931), American inventor, educator, caterer and women's rights campaigner
 Charles Mantoux (1877–1947), France – Mantoux test (tuberculosis)
 Guglielmo Marconi (1874–1937), Italy – radio telegraphy
 Gheorghe Marinescu (1863–1938), Romania – the first science films in the world in the neurology clinic in Bucharest (1898–1901)
 Sylvester Marsh (1803–1884), U.S. – Marsh rack railway system
 Konosuke Matsushita (1894–1989), Japan – battery-powered Bicycle lighting
 Taqi al-Din Muhammad ibn Ma'ruf (1526–1585), Syria/Egypt/Turkey – steam turbine, six-cylinder 'Monobloc' suction pump, framed sextant
 Alex Mashinsky (born 1965), U.S. - VoIP
 John Landis Mason (1826–1902), U.S. – Mason jars
 Fujio Masuoka (born 1943), Japan – Flash memory
 John W. Mauchly (1907–1980), U.S. – ENIAC – the first general purpose programmable digital computer
 Henry Maudslay (1771–1831), UK – screw-cutting lathe, bench micrometer
 Hiram Maxim (1840–1916), U.S. born, UK – First self-powered machine gun
 James Clerk Maxwell (1831–1879) and Thomas Sutton, Scotland – color photography
 Stanley Mazor (born 1941), U.S. – microprocessor
 John Loudon McAdam (1756–1836), Scotland – improved "macadam" road surface
 Elijah McCoy (1843–1929), Canada – Displacement lubricator
 Nicholas McKay Sr. (1920–2014), U.S. – Lint roller
 Frederick McKinley Jones (1893–1961), U.S. – 22 patents, the most prominent for an automatic refrigeration system for long-haul trucks
 James McLurkin (born 1972), U.S. – Ant robotics (robotics)
 Ilya Ilyich Mechnikov (1845–1916), Russia – probiotics
 Hippolyte Mège-Mouriès (1817–1880), France – margarine
 Mordecai Meirowitz (born 1930), Roumania / Israel – Mastermind (board game)
 Dmitri Mendeleev (1834–1907), Russia – Periodic table, pycnometer, pyrocollodion
 Richard B. Merrill (1949–2008), U.S. – Foveon X3 sensor
 George de Mestral (1907–1990), Switzerland – Velcro
 Robert Metcalfe (born 1946), U.S. – Ethernet
 Antonio Meucci (1808–1889), Italy/U.S. – various early telephones, a hygrometer, a milk test
 Édouard Michelin (1859–1940), France – pneumatic tire
 Anthony Michell (1870–1959), Australia – tilting pad thrust bearing, crankless engine
 Artem Mikoyan (1905–1970), Armenia/Russia – MiG-series fighter aircraft, including world's most produced jet aircraft MiG-15 and most produced supersonic aircraft MiG-21 (together with Mikhail Gurevich)
 Alexander Mikulin (1895–1985), Russia – Mikulin AM-34 and other Soviet aircraft engines, co-developer of the Tsar Tank
 Mikhail Mil (1909–1970), Russia – Mi-series helicopter aircraft, including Mil Mi-8 (the world's most-produced helicopter) and Mil Mi-12 (the world's largest helicopter)
 Alexander Miles (1838–1918), U.S. – system for automatically opening and closing elevator doors
 David L. Mills (born 1938), U.S. – Fuzzball router, Network Time Protocol
 Marvin Minsky (1927–2016), U.S. – Confocal microscopy
 Tokushichi Mishima (1893–1975), Japan – MKM magnetic steel
 Pavel Molchanov (1893–1941), Russia – Radiosonde
 Jules Montenier (1895–1962), U.S. – Anti-perspirant deodorant
 Montgolfier brothers (1740–1810) and (1745–1799), France – hot air balloon
 John J. Montgomery (1858–1911), U.S. – heavier-than-air gliders
 Narcis Monturiol i Estarriol (1819–1885), Spain – steam powered submarine
 Robert Moog (1934–2005), U.S. – the Moog synthesizer
 John J. Mooney (1930–2020), together with Carl D. Keith (1920–2008), U.S. – three way catalytic converter
 Roland Moreno (1945–2012), France – inventor of the smart card
 Samuel Morey (1762–1843), U.S. – internal combustion engine
 Garrett A. Morgan (1877–1963), U.S. – inventor of the smoke hood
 Alexander Morozov (1904–1979), Russia – T-54/55 (the most produced tank in history), co-developer of T-34
 Walter Frederick Morrison (1920–2010), U.S. – Flying disc
 William Morrison (dentist) (1860–1926), U.S. – Cotton candy machine
 Samuel Morse (1791–1872), U.S. – early Morse code, see also Morse Code controversy
 Sergei Ivanovich Mosin (1849–1902), Russia – Mosin–Nagant rifle
 Motorins, Ivan Feodorovich (1660s–1735) and his son Mikhail Ivanovich (?–1750), Russia – Tsar Bell
 Vera Mukhina (1889–1953), Russia – welded sculpture
 Kary Mullis (1944–2019), U.S. – PCR
 Fe del Mundo (1911–2011), Philippines – medical incubator made out of bamboo for use in rural communities without electrical power
 Colin Murdoch (1929–2008), New Zealand – Tranquillizer gun, disposable hypodermic syringe
 William Murdoch (1754–1839), Scotland – Gas lighting
 Jozef Murgas (1864–1929), Slovakia – inventor of the wireless telegraph (forerunner of the radio)
 Evgeny Murzin (1914–1970), Russia – ANS synthesizer
 Banū Mūsā brothers, Muhammad (c. 800–873), Ahmad (803–873), Al-Hasan (810–873), Iraq – mechanical trick devices, hurricane lamp, self-trimming and self-feeding lamp, gas mask, clamshell grab, fail-safe system, mechanical musical instrument, automatic flute player, programmable machine
 Pieter van Musschenbroek (1692–1761), Netherlands – Leyden jar, pyrometer
 Walton Musser (1909–1998), U.S. – Harmonic drive gear
 Eadweard Muybridge (1830–1904), UK – motion picture
 Ted Myerson (born 1975), U.S. – data cloud computing system patents

N
 Georgi Nadjakov (1896–1981), Bulgaria – :wikt:photoelectret
 Alexander Nadiradze (1914–1987), Georgia/Russia – first mobile ICBM (RT-21 Temp 2S), first reliable mobile ICBM (RT-2PM Topol)
 Nagai Nagayoshi (1844–1929), Japan – Methamphetamine
 James Naismith (1861–1939), Canadian born, U.S. – invented basketball and American football helmet
 Yoshiro Nakamatsu (born 1928), Japan – "PyonPyon" spring shoes, digital watch, CinemaScope, armchair "Cerebrex", sauce pump, taxicab meter
 Shuji Nakamura (born 1954), Japan – Blue laser
 John Napier (1550–1617), Scotland – logarithms
 Andrey Nartov (1683–1756), Russia – first lathe with a mechanic cutting tool-supporting carriage and a set of gears, fast-fire battery on a rotating disc, screw mechanism for changing the artillery fire angle, gauge–boring lathe for cannon-making, early telescopic sight
 James Nasmyth (1808–1890), Scotland – steam hammer
 Giulio Natta (1903–1979), together with Karl Ziegler (1898–1973), Italy/Germany – Ziegler–Natta catalyst
 William Neade (fl.1624–1637), England – weapon combining a longbow and a pike
 Nebuchadrezzar II (634–562 BC), Iraq (Mesopotamia) – screw, screwpump
 Erwin Neher (born 1944), together with Bert Sakmann (1942–), Germany – Patch clamp technique
 Ted Nelson (born 1937), U.S. – Hypertext, Hypermedia
 Sergey Nepobedimiy (1921–2014), Russia – first supersonic anti-tank guided missile Sturm, other Soviet rocket weaponry
 Karl Nessler (1872–1951), Germany/U.S. – Permanent wave machine, artificial eyebrows
 Bernard de Neumann (1943–2018), UK – massively parallel self-configuring multi-processor
 John von Neumann (1903–1957), Hungary – Von Neumann computer architecture, Stochastic computing, Merge sort algorithm
 Isaac Newton (1642–1727), UK – reflecting telescope (which reduces chromatic aberration)
 Miguel Nicolelis (born 1961), Brazil – Brain-machine interfaces
 Joseph Nicephore Niépce (1765–1833), France – photography
 Nikolai Nikitin (1907–1973), Russia – prestressed concrete with wire ropes structure (Ostankino Tower), Nikitin-Travush 4000 project (precursor to X-Seed 4000)
 Paul Gottlieb Nipkow (1860–1940), Germany – Nipkow disk
 Jun-ichi Nishizawa (1926–2018), Japan – Optical communication system, SIT/SITh (Static Induction Transistor/Thyristor), Laser diode, PIN diode
 Alfred Nobel (1833–1896), Sweden – dynamite
 Ludvig Nobel (1831–1888), Sweden/Russia – first successful oil tanker
 Emmy Noether (1882–1935), Germany, groundbreaking contributions to abstract algebra and theoretical physics; Noether's Theorem
 Jean-Antoine Nollet (1700–1770), France – Electroscope
 Wilhelm Normann (1870–1939), Germany – Hydrogenation of fats
 Carl Richard Nyberg (1858–1939), Sweden – the blowtorch

O
 Aaron D. O'Connell (born 1981), U.S. – first Quantum machine
 Joseph John O'Connell (1861–1959), U.S. – number of inventions relating to telephony and electrical engineering
 Theophil Wilgodt Odhner (1845–1903), Sweden/Russia – the Odhner Arithmometer, a mechanical calculator
 Paul Offit (born 1951), U.S., along with Fred Clark and Stanley Plotkin, invented a pentavalent Rotavirus vaccine
 Jarkko Oikarinen (born 1967), Finland – Internet Relay Chat (IRC)
 Katsuhiko Okamoto (?–), Japan – Okamoto Cubes = modifications of Rubik's Cube
 Ransom Eli Olds (1864–1950), U.S. – Assembly line
 Lucien Olivier (1838–1883), Belgium or France / Russia – Russian salad (Olivier salad)
 Gerard K. O'Neill (1927–1992), U.S. – Storage ring (physics)
 J. Robert Oppenheimer (1904–1967), United States – Atomic bomb
 Hugh Orr (1715–1798), U.S. – machine for cleaning flax seed
 Hans Christian Ørsted (1777–1851), Denmark – electromagnetism, aluminium
 Elisha Otis (1811–1861), U.S. – safety system for elevators
 William Oughtred (1575–1660), UK – slide rule

P
 Arogyaswami Paulraj (born 1944), India/U.S. – MIMO
 Antonio Pacinotti (1841–1912), Italy – Pacinotti dynamo
 Hilary Page (1904-1957), UK – Self-Locking Building Bricks, the predecessor of Lego
 Larry Page (born 1973), U.S. – with Sergey Brin invented Google web search engine
 William Painter (1838–1906), UK/U.S. – Crown cork, Bottle opener
 Salvatore Pais (born 1967), Romania/U.S. – an electromagnetic field generator to deflect asteroids away from the Earth, an inertial mass reduction device, a room-temperature superconductor, a gravitational wave generator, and a compact fusion reactor
 Alexey Pajitnov (born 1956), Russia/U.S. – Tetris
 Julio Palmaz (born 1945), Argentina – balloon-expandable, stent
 Helge Palmcrantz (1842–1880), Sweden – the multi-barrel, lever-actuated, machine gun
 Daniel David Palmer (1845–1913), Canada – chiropractic
 Luigi Palmieri (1807–1896), Italy – seismometer
 Frank Pantridge (1916–2004), Ireland – Portable defibrillator
 Georgios Papanikolaou (1883–1962), Greece / U.S. – Papanicolaou stain, Pap test = Pap smear
 Alice H. Parker (1895–1920), U.S. – central heating using natural gas furnace
 Philip M. Parker (born 1960), U.S. – computer automated book authoring
 Thomas Parker (1843–1915), England – electric car
 Alexander Parkes (1831–1890), UK – celluloid
 Florence Parpart ( 1856–?), U.S. – industrial sweeping machine, electrical refrigerator
 Forrest Parry (1921–2005), U.S. – Magnetic stripe card
 Charles Algernon Parsons (1854–1931), British – steam turbine
 Spede Pasanen (1930–2001), Finland – ski jumping sling, boat ski
 Blaise Pascal (1623–1662), France – Pascal's calculator
 Gustaf Erik Pasch (1788–1862), Sweden – safety match
 Dimitar Paskov (1914–1986), Bulgaria – Galantamine
 C. Kumar N. Patel (born 1938), India/U.S. – Carbon dioxide laser
 Les Paul (1915–2009), U.S. – multitrack recording
 Andreas Pavel (born 1945), Brazil – audio devices
 Ivan Pavlov (1849–1936), Russia, – classical conditioning
 Floyd Paxton (1918–1975), U.S. – Bread clip
 John Pemberton (1831–1888), U.S. – Coca-Cola
 Slavoljub Eduard Penkala (1871–1922), Croatia – mechanical pencil
 Ralph Peo (1897–1966), U.S. – early Automobile air conditioning, shock absorbers
 William Henry Perkin (1838–1907), UK – first synthetic organic chemical dye Mauveine
 Henry Perky (1843–1906), U.S. – shredded wheat
 Alfred Perot (1863–1925), together with Charles Fabry (1867–1945), France – Fabry–Pérot interferometer (physics)
 Stephen Perry, UK (fl. 19th century) – rubber band
 Aurel Persu (1890–1977), Romania – first aerodynamic car, aluminum body with wheels included under the body, 1922
 Vladimir Petlyakov (1891–1942), Russia – heavy bomber
 Julius Richard Petri (1852–1921), Germany – Petri dish
 Peter Petroff (1919–2004), Bulgaria – digital wrist watch, heart monitor, weather instruments
 Fritz Pfleumer (1881–1945), Germany – magnetic tape
 Auguste Piccard (1884–1962), Switzerland – Bathyscaphe
 Gregory Goodwin Pincus (1903–1967), together with Min Chueh Chang (1908–1991), U.S./China – Combined oral contraceptive pill
 Nikolay Ivanovich Pirogov (1810–1881), Russia – early use of ether as anaesthetic, first anaesthesia in a field operation, various kinds of surgical operations
 Fyodor Pirotsky (1845–1898), Russia – electric tram
 Arthur Pitney (1871–1933), U.S. – postage meter
 Hippolyte Pixii (1808–1835), France – Pixii dynamo
 Joseph Plateau (1801–1883), Belgium – phenakistiscope (stroboscope)
 Baltzar von Platen (1898–1984), Sweden – gas absorption refrigerator
 James Leonard Plimpton (1828–1911), U.S. – roller skates
 Ivan Plotnikov (1902–1995), Russia – kirza leather
 Roy Plunkett (1910–1994), U.S. – Teflon
 Petrache Poenaru (1799–1875), Romania – fountain pen
 Christopher Polhem (1661–1751), Sweden – Padlock
 Nikolai Polikarpov (1892–1944), Russia – Po-series aircraft, including Polikarpov Po-2 Kukuruznik (world's most produced biplane)
 Eugene Polley (1915–2012), U.S. – wireless remote control (with Robert Adler)
 Ivan Polzunov (1728–1766), Russia – first two-cylinder steam engine
 Mikhail Pomortsev (1851–1916), Russia  – nephoscope
 Olivia Poole (1889–1975), U.S. – the Jolly Jumper baby harness
 Alexander Popov (1859–1906), Russia – radio pioneer, created a radio receiver that worked as a lightning detector
 Nikolay Popov (1931–2008), Russia – first fully gas turbine main battle tank (T-80)
 Josef Popper  (1838–1921), Austria – discovered the transmission of power by electricity.
 Aleksandr Porokhovschikov (1892–1941), Russia – Vezdekhod (the first prototype tank, or tankette, and the first caterpillar amphibious ATV)
 Ignazio Porro (1801–1875), Italy – Porro prism, strip camera
 Valdemar Poulsen (1869–1942), Denmark – magnetic wire recorder, arc converter
 Joseph Priestley (1733–1804), UK – soda water
 Robert Taylor Pritchett (1828–1907), UK – Pritchett bullet
 Alexander Procofieff de Seversky (1894–1974), Russia/U.S. – first gyroscopically stabilized bombsight, ionocraft, also developed air-to-air refueling
 Alexander Prokhorov (1916–2002), Russia – co-inventor of laser and maser
 Petro Prokopovych (1775–1850), Russian Empire – early beehive frame, queen excluder and other beekeeping novelties
 Sergey Prokudin-Gorsky (1863–1944), Russia/France – early colour photography method based on three colour channels, also colour film slides and colour motion pictures
 Mark Publicover (born 1958), U.S. – first affordable trampoline safety net enclosure
 George Pullman (1831–1897), U.S. – Pullman sleep wagon
 Michael I. Pupin (1858–1935), Serbia – pupinization (loading coils), tunable oscillator
 Tivadar Puskás (1844–1893), Hungary – telephone exchange

Q
 Calvin Quate (1923–2019), with Gerd Binnig (born 1947), and with Christoph Gerber (1942–), U.S./Germany/Switzerland – Atomic force microscope
 Adolphe Quetelet (1796–1874), France/Belgium – Body mass index (BMI)

R
 Jacob Rabinow (1910–1999), U.S. – Magnetic particle clutch, various Phonograph-related patents
 John Goffe Rand (1801–1873), U.S. – Tube (container)
 Robert Ransome (1753–1830), England – improvement to the plough
 Muhammad ibn Zakarīya Rāzi (Rhazes) (865–965), Persia/Iran – distillation and extraction methods, sulfuric acid and hydrochloric acid, soap kerosene, kerosene lamp, chemotherapy, sodium hydroxide
 Alec Reeves (1902–1971), UK – Pulse-code modulation
 Karl von Reichenbach (1788–1869), Germany – paraffin, creosote oil, phenol
 Tadeus Reichstein (1897–1996), Poland/Switzerland – Reichstein process (industrial vitamin C synthesis)
 Ira Remsen (1846–1927), U.S. – saccharin
 Ralf Reski (born 1958), Germany – Moss bioreactor 1998
 Josef Ressel (1793–1857), Czechoslovakia – ship propeller
 William Reynolds (1758–1803), England – canal inclined plane
 Ri Sung-gi (1905–1996), North Korea – Vinylon
 Charles Francis Richter (1900–1985), U.S. – Richter magnitude scale
 Adolph Rickenbacker (1886–1976), Switzerland – Electric guitar
 Hyman George Rickover (1900–1986), U.S. – Nuclear submarine
 Niklaus Riggenbach (1817–1899), Switzerland – Riggenbach rack railway system, Counter-pressure brake
 Dennis Ritchie (1941–2011), U.S. – C (programming language)
 Gilles de Roberval (1602–1675), France – Roberval balance
 John Roebuck (1718–1794) UK – lead chamber process for sulfuric acid synthesis
 Francis Rogallo (1912–2009), U.S. – Rogallo wing
 Heinrich Rohrer (1933–2013), together with Gerd Binnig (1947–), Switzerland/Germany – Scanning tunneling microscope
 Peter I the Great (Pyotr Alexeyevich Romanov), Tsar and Emperor of Russia (1672–1725), Russia – decimal currency, yacht club, sounding line with separating plummet (sounding weight probe)
 Wilhelm Conrad Röntgen (1845–1923), Germany – the X-ray machine
 Ida Rosenthal (1886–1973), Belarus/Russia/U.S. – Bra (Maidenform), the standard of cup sizes, nursing bra, full-figured bra, the first seamed uplift bra (all with her husband William)
 Sidney Rosenthal (1907–1979), U.S. – Magic Marker
 Eugene Roshal (born 1972), Russia – FAR file manager, RAR file format, WinRAR file archiver
 Boris Rosing (1869–1933), Russia – CRT television (first television system using CRT on the receiving side)
 Guido van Rossum (born 1956), The Netherlands – Python (programming language)
 Michael Rothman, U.S. – UEFI
 Subrata Roy (scientist) (born 1962), India, U.S. – Wingless Electromagnetic Air Vehicle, Serpentine geometry plasma actuator, micro-scale actuators
 Jean-François Pilâtre de Rozier (1754–1785), France – Rozière balloon
 Ernő Rubik (born 1944), Hungary – Rubik's Cube, Rubik's Magic and Rubik's Clock
 Ernst Ruska (1906–1988), Germany – electron microscope
 François van Rysselberghe (1846–1893), Belgium – Universal meteorograph, Condenser telephone

S
 Albert Bruce Sabin (1906–1993), U.S. – oral Polio vaccine
 Alexander Sablukov (1783–1857), Russia – centrifugal fan
 Şerafeddin Sabuncuoğlu (1385–1468), Turkey – illustrated surgical atlas
 Gilles Saint-Hilaire (born 1948), Canada – Quasiturbine, Qurbine
 Andrei Sakharov (1921–1989), Russia – invented explosively pumped flux compression generator, co-developed the Tsar Bomb and tokamak
 Jonas Edward Salk (1914–1995), U.S. – injection Polio vaccine
 Robert Salmon (1763–1821), England – agricultural implements
 Franz San Galli (1824–1908), Poland/Russia (Italian and German descent) – radiator, central heating
 Frederick Sanger (1918–2013), U.S. – Sanger sequencing (= DNA sequencing)
 Larry Sanger (born 1968), together with Jimmy Wales, U.S. – Wikipedia
 Yoshiyuki Sankai (born c. 1957), Japan – Robotic exoskeleton for motion support (medicine)
 Alberto Santos-Dumont (1873–1932), Brazil – non-rigid airship and airplane
 Arthur William Savage (1857–1938) – radial tires, gun magazines, Savage Model 99 lever action rifle
 Thomas Savery (1650–1715), UK – steam engine
 Adolphe Sax (1814–1894), Belgium – saxophone
 Vincent Joseph Schaefer (1906–1993), U.S. – Cloud seeding by dry ice
 Bela Schick (1877–1967), Hungary – diphtheria test
 Wilhelm Schickard (1592–1635), Germany – mechanical calculator
 Hugo Schiff (1834–1915), Germany – Schiff test (histology)
 Pavel Schilling (1786–1837), Estonia/Russia – first electromagnetic telegraph, mine with an electric fuse
 Gilmore Schjeldahl (1912–2002), U.S. – Airsickness bag
 Hubert Schlafly (1919–2011), U.S. – Teleprompter = Autocue
 Wilhelm Schlenk (1879–1943), Germany – Schlenk flask (chemistry)
 Bernhard Schmidt (1879–1935), Estonia/Germany – Schmidt camera
 Friedrich Schmiedl (1902–1994), Austria – rocket mail
 Otto Schmitt (1913–1998), U.S. – Schmitt trigger (electronics)
 Christian Schnabel (1878–1936), German – simplistic food cutleries
 Kees A. Schouhamer Immink (born 1946), Netherlands – Major contributor to development of Compact Disc
 August Schrader (1807–1894), U.S. – Schrader valve for Pneumatic tire
 David Schwarz (1852–1897), Croatia, – rigid airship, later called Zeppelin
 Raymond Scott (1908–1994), U.S. – inventor and developer of electronic music technology
 Girolamo Segato (1792–1836), Italy – artificial petrifaction of human cadavers
 Marc Seguin (1786–1875), France – wire-cable suspension bridge
 Hanaoka Seishū (1760–1835), Japan – General anaesthetic
 Ted Selker (inv. 1987), U.S. – Pointing stick
 Sennacherib (705–681 BC), Iraq (Mesopotamia) – screw pump
 Léon Serpollet (1858–1907), France – Flash boiler, Gardner-Serpollet steam car
 Iwan Serrurier (1878–1953), Netherlands/U.S. – inventor of the Moviola for film editing
 Mark Serrurier (1904–1988), U.S. – Serrurier truss for Optical telescopes
 Gerhard Sessler (born 1931), Germany – foil electret microphone, silicon microphone
 Guy Severin (1926–2008), Russia – extra-vehicular activity supporting system
 Ed Seymour (inv. c. 1949), U.S. – Aerosol paint
 Leonty Shamshurenkov (1687–1758), Russia – first self-propelling carriage (a precursor to both bicycle and automobile), projects of an original odometer and self-propelling sledge
 Ibn al-Shatir (1304–1375), Syria – "jewel box" device which combined a compass with a universal sundial
 Bi Sheng (c. 990–1051), China – clay movable type printing
 Patsy O’Connell Sherman (1930–2008), U.S. – Scotchgard
 Murasaki Shikibu (c. 973–1025), Japan – psychological novel
 Pyotr Shilovsky (1871–1957), Russia/UK – gyrocar
 Masatoshi Shima (born 1943), Japan – microprocessor
 Fathullah Shirazi (c. 1582), Mughal India – early volley gun
 Joseph Shivers (1920–2014), U.S. – Spandex
 William Bradford Shockley (1910–1989), U.S. – co-inventor of transistor
 Henry Shrapnel (1761–1842), UK – Shrapnel shell ammunition
 Vladimir Shukhov (1853–1939), Russia – thermal cracking (Shukhov cracking process), thin-shell structure, tensile structure, hyperboloid structure, gridshell, oil pipeline, cylindric oil depot
 Sheikh Muszaphar Shukor (born 1972), Malaysia – cell growth in outer space, crystallization of proteins and microbes in space
 Augustus Siebe (1788–1872), Germany/UK – Inventor of the standard diving dress
 Sir William Siemens (1823–1883), Germany – regenerative furnace
 Werner von Siemens (1816–1892), Germany – electric elevator, Electromote (= first trolleybus), an early Dynamo
 Al-Sijzi (c. 945–1020), Persia/Iran – heliocentric astrolabe
 Igor Sikorsky (1889–1972), Russia/U.S. – first four-engine fixed-wing aircraft (Russky Vityaz), first airliner and purpose-designed bomber (Ilya Muromets), helicopter, Sikorsky-series helicopters
 Bernard Silver (1924–1963), together with Norman Joseph Woodland (1921–2012), U.S. – Barcode
 Kia Silverbrook (born 1958), Australia – Memjet printer, world's most prolific inventor
 Luther Simjian (1905–1997), Armenia/U.S. - Automated teller machine (ATM)
 Vladimir Simonov (1935–2020), Russia – APS Underwater Assault Rifle, SPP-1 underwater pistol
 Charles Simonyi (born 1948), Hungary – Hungarian notation
 Ibn Sina (Avicenna) (980–1037), Persia/Iran – steam distillation, essential oil, pharmacopoeia, clinical pharmacology, clinical trial, randomized controlled trial, quarantine, cancer surgery, cancer therapy, pharmacotherapy, phytotherapy, Hindiba, Taxus baccata L, calcium channel blocker
 Clive Sinclair (1940-2021), U.K. - Sinclair C5, ZX Spectrum and A-bike
 Isaac Singer (1811–1875), U.S. – sewing machine
 B. F. Skinner (1904–1990), U.S. – Operant conditioning chamber
 Nikolay Slavyanov (1854–1897), Russia – shielded metal arc welding
 Alexander Smakula (1900–1983), Ukraine/Russia/U.S. – anti-reflective coating
 Michael Smith (1932–2000), U.S. – Site-directed mutagenesis (molecular biology)
 Oliver Smithies (1925–2017), together with Sir Martin John Evans (born 1941), and Mario Ramberg Capecchi (born 1937), U.S. – Knockout mouse, Gene targeting
 Yefim Smolin, Russia – table-glass (stakan granyonyi)
 Friedrich Soennecken (1848–1919), Germany – Ring binder, Hole punch
 Su Song (1020–1101), China – first chain drive
 Marin Soljačić (born 1974), Croatia – Resonant inductive coupling
 Edwin Southern (born 1938), U.S. – Southern blot (molecular biology)
 Alfred P. Southwick (1826–1898), U.S. – Electric chair
 Igor Spassky (born 1926), Russia – Sea Launch platform
 Percy Spencer (1894–1970), U.S. – microwave oven
 Elmer Ambrose Sperry (1860–1930), U.S. – gyroscope-guided automatic pilot
 Lyman Spitzer (1914–1997), U.S. – Stellarator (physics)
 Frank J. Sprague (1857-1934), father of electric traction, electric elevator improvements and electric multiple unit trains.
 Bhargav Sri Prakash (born 1977), India/U.S. – Digital vaccines, learnification platform at FriendsLearn, virtual reality system, electromagnetic collision avoidance system, OBD based in-vehicle powertrain performance measurement, rate-based driver controls for drive by wire systems
 Ladislas Starevich (1882–1965), Russia/France – puppet animation, live-action/animated film
 Gary Starkweather (1938–2019), U.S. – laser printer, color management
 John Kemp Starley (1855-1901), U.K. - safety bicycle
 Betsey Ann Stearns (1830-1914), U.S. – garment cutting diagram and system
 Boris Stechkin (1891–1969), Russia – co-developer of Sikorsky Ilya Muromets and Tsar Tank, developer of Soviet heat and aircraft engines
 George Stephenson (1781–1848), UK – steam railway
 Simon Stevin (1548–1620), Netherlands – land yacht
 Andreas Stihl (1896–1973), Switzerland/Germany – Electric chain saw
 Reverend Dr Robert Stirling (1790–1878), Scotland – Stirling engine
 Aurel Stodola (1859–1942), Slovakia – gas turbines
 Aleksandr Stoletov (1839–1896), Russia – first solar cell based on the outer photoelectric effect
 Levi Strauss (1829–1902), U.S. – blue jeans
 John Stringfellow (1799–1883), UK – aerial steam carriage
 Bjarne Stroustrup (born 1950), Denmark – C++ (programming language)
 Almon Strowger (1839–1902), U.S. – automatic telephone exchange
 Emil Strub (1858–1909), Switzerland – Strub rack railway system
 Abd al-Rahman al-Sufi (Azophi) (903–986), Persia/Iran – timekeeping astrolabe, navigational astrolabe, surveying astrolabe
 René Núñez Suárez (born 1945/1946), El Salvador – "turbococina" (turbo-cooker)
 Kyota Sugimoto (1882–1972), Japan – Japanese language typewriter
 Mutsuo Sugiura (1918–1986), Japan – Esophagogastroduodenoscope
 Pavel Sukhoi (1895–1975), Russia – Su-series fighter aircraft
 Simon Sunatori (born 1959), Canada – inventor of MagneScribe and Magic Spicer
 Sushruta (600 BC), Vedic India – inventor of Plastic Surgery, Cataract Surgery, Rhinoplasty
 Theodor Svedberg (1884–1971), Sweden – Analytical ultracentrifuge
 Joseph Swan (1828–1914), UK – Incandescent light bulb
 Robert Swanson (1905–1994), Canada – invented and developed the first multi-chime air horn for use with diesel locomotives
 Remi Swierczek (born 1958), Poland – inventor of Music Identification System and the Mico Changer (coin hopper and dispenser used in casinos)
 Andrei Sychra (c.1773/76–1850), Lithuania/Russia, Czech descent – Russian seven-string guitar
 Walter Sylvester (1867–1944), UK – the "Sylvester", for safely removing pit props
 Vladimir Syromyatnikov (1933–2006), Russia – Androgynous Peripheral Attach System and other spacecraft docking mechanisms
 Simon Sze (born 1936), Taiwan/U.S., together with Dawon Kahng (1931–1992), South Korea – Floating-gate MOSFET
 Leó Szilárd (1898–1964), Hungary/U.S. – co-developed the atomic bomb, patented the nuclear reactor, catalyst of the Manhattan Project

T
 Muhammad Salih Tahtawi (fl.1659–1660), Mughal India – seamless globe and celestial globe
 Gyula Takátsy (1914–1980), Hungary – first Microtiter plate
 Esther Takeuchi (born 1953) – holds more than 150 US-patents, the largest number for any woman in the United States
 Igor Tamm (1895–1971), Russia – co-developer of tokamak
 Ching W. Tang (born 1947), Hong Kong/U.S., together with Steven Van Slyke, U.S. – OLED
 Mardi bin Ali al-Tarsusi (c. 1187), Middle East – counterweight trebuchet, mangonel
 Gustav Tauschek (1899–1945), Austria – Drum memory
 Kenyon Taylor (1908–1986), U.S. – Flip-disc display
 Bernard Tellegen (1900–1990), Netherlands – pentode
 Edward Teller (1908–2003), Hungary – hydrogen bomb
 Eli Terry (1772–1852)
 Nikola Tesla (1856–1943), Serbia – induction motor, high-voltage / high-frequency power experiments, the transmission of electrical power
 Léon Theremin (1896–1993), Russia – theremin, interlace, burglar alarm, terpsitone, Rhythmicon (first drum machine), The Thing (listening device)
 Charles Xavier Thomas de Colmar (1785–1870), France – Arithmometer
 Elihu Thomson (1853–1937), UK, U.S. – Prolific inventor, Arc lamp and many others
 William Thomson, 1st Baron Kelvin (1824–1907), UK – Kelvin absolute temperature scale
 Eric Tigerstedt (1887–1925), Finland – Sound-on-film, triode vacuum tube
 Kálmán Tihanyi (1897–1947), Hungary – co-inventor of cathode ray tube and iconoscope
 Mikhail Tikhonravov (1900–1974), Russia – co-developer of Sputnik 1 (the first artificial satellite) together with Korolyov and Keldysh, designer of further Sputniks
 Gavriil Adrianovich Tikhov (1875–1960), Russia – feathering spectrograph
 Benjamin Chew Tilghman (1821–1897), U.S. – sandblasting
 Fedor Tokarev (1871–1968), Russia – TT-33 semiautomatic handgun and SVT-40 self-loading rifle
 Ray Tomlinson (1941–2016), U.S. – First inter-computer email
 Evangelista Torricelli (1608–1647), Italy – barometer
 Alfred Traeger (1895–1980), Australia – Pedal radio
 Richard Trevithick (1771–1833), UK – high-pressure steam engine, first full-scale steam locomotive
 Franc Trkman (1903–1978), Slovenia – electrical switches, accessories for opening windows
 Hans Tropsch (1889–1935), together with Franz Joseph Emil Fischer (1877–1947), Germany – Fischer–Tropsch process (refinery process)
 Yuri Trutnev (1927–2021), Russia – co-developer of the Tsar Bomb
 Roger Y. Tsien (1952–2016), together with Osamu Shimomura (1928–2018) and Martin Chalfie (born 1947), U.S. – Discovery and development of Green fluorescent protein
 Konstantin Tsiolkovsky (1857–1935), Russia – spaceflight
 Mikhail Tsvet (1872–1919), Russia – chromatography (specifically adsorption chromatography, the first chromatography method)
 Alexei Tupolev (1925–2001), Russia – the Tupolev Tu-144 (first supersonic passenger jet)
 Andrei Tupolev (1888–1972), Russia – turboprop powered long-range airliner (Tupolev Tu-114), turboprop strategic bomber (Tupolev Tu-95)
 Nasīr al-Dīn al-Tūsī (1201–1274), Persia/Iran – observatory, Tusi-couple
 Sharaf al-Dīn al-Tūsī (1135–1213), Persia/Iran – linear astrolabe
 Ralph Hart Tweddell (1843–1895), England – portable hydraulic riveter

U
 Shintaro Uda (1869–1976), together with Hidetsugu Yagi (1886–1976), Japan – Yagi–Uda antenna–
 Lewis Urry (1927–2004), Canada – long-lasting alkaline battery
 Tomislav Uzelac, Croatia – first successful MP3 player, AMP

V
 Ira Van Gieson (1866–1913), U.S. – Van Gieson's stain (histology)
 Theophilus Van Kannel (1841–1919), U.S. – revolving door (1888)
 Vladimir Veksler (1907–1966), Russia – synchrophasotron, co-inventor of synchrotron
 John Venn (1834–1923), UK – Venn diagram (1881)
 Auguste Victor Louis Verneuil (1856–1913), France – Verneuil process (crystal growth)
 Pierre Vernier (1580–1637), France – Vernier scale (1631)
 Lucien Vidi (1805–1866), France – Barograph
 Edgar Villchur (1917–2011), U.S. – Acoustic suspension (loudspeaker)
 Artturi Ilmari Virtanen (1895–1973), Finland – AIV fodder
 Alessandro Volta (1745–1827), Italy – battery, see also Voltaic pile
 Bernard Vonnegut (1914–1997), together with Henry Chessin, and Richard E. Passarelli Jr., U.S. – Cloud seeding by silver iodide
 Ivan Vučetić (1858–1925), Croatia – method of fingerprint classification

W
 Ruth Graves Wakefield (1903–1977), U.S. – chocolate chip cookie
 Paul Walden (1863–1957), Latvia/Russia/Germany – Walden inversion, Ethylammonium nitrate (the first room temperature ionic liquid)
 Jimmy Wales (born 1966), together with Larry Sanger, U.S. – Wikipedia
 Adam Walker (1730–1821), UK – eidouranion
 Madam C.J. Walker (1867–1919), U.S. – beauty and hair products for African American women
 Barnes Wallis (1887–1979), UK – bouncing bomb
 Frederick Walton (c. 1834–1928), UK – Linoleum
 Maurice Ward (1933–2011), UK – Starlite
 Aldred Scott Warthin (1866–1931), together with Allen Chronister Starry (1890–1973), U.S. – Warthin–Starry stain (histology)
 Robert Watson-Watt (1892–1973), Scotland – microwave radar
 James Watt (1736–1819), Scotland – improved Steam engine
 Thomas Wedgwood (1771–1805), UK – first (not permanent) photograph
 Carl Auer von Welsbach (1858–1929), Austria – Gas mantle, ferrocerium
 Jonas Wenström (1855–1893), Sweden – three-phase electrical power
 George Westinghouse (1846–1914), U.S. – Air brake (rail)
 Charles Wheatstone (1802–1875), UK – concertina, stereoscope, microphone, Playfair cipher, pseudoscope, dynamo
 Richard T. Whitcomb (1921–2009), U.S. – Supercritical airfoil, Winglet
 Cornelius Whitehouse (1796–1883), UK – method of manufacturing tubes cheaply and accurately
 Eli Whitney (1765–1825), U.S. – the cotton gin
 Frank Whittle (1907–1996), UK – co-inventor of the jet engine
 Otto Wichterle (1913–1989), Czechoslovakia – soft contact lens
 Norman Wilkinson (1878–1971), UK – Dazzle camouflage
 Charles Thomson Rees Wilson (1869–1959), UK – Cloud chamber
 Paul Winchell (1922–2005), U.S. – the artificial heart
 Sergei Winogradsky (1856–1953), Russia / USSR – Winogradsky column for culturing microorganisms
 Niklaus Wirth (born 1934), Switzerland – Pascal (programming language)
 A. Baldwin Wood (1879–1956), U.S. – high volume pump
 Norman Joseph Woodland (1921–2012), together with Bernard Silver (1924–1963), U.S. – Barcode
 Granville Woods (1856–1910), U.S. – the Synchronous Multiplex Railway Telegraph
 Steve Wozniak (born 1950), U.S. – Apple I & II computers, early Macintosh concepts,  CL 9 CORE universal remote and other devices and applications.
 James Homer Wright (1869–1928), U.S. – Wright's stain (histology)
 Wright brothers, Orville (1871–1948) and Wilbur (1867–1912) – U.S. – powered airplane
 Wu Yulu, Chinese farmer and inventor of home-made robots
 Adam Wybe (1584-1653), Dutch - inventor of the cable car on multiple supports
 Arthur Wynne (1871–1945), UK – creator of crossword puzzle

X
 Yi Xing (683–727), China – Astronomical clock

Y
 Pavel Yablochkov (1847–1894), Russia – Yablochkov candle (first commercially viable electric carbon arc lamp)
 Hidetsugu Yagi (1886–1976), together with Shintaro Uda (1896–1976), Japan – Yagi–Uda antenna
 Alexander Yakovlev (1906–1989), Russia – Yak-series aircraft, including Yakovlev Yak-40 (the first regional jet)
 Linus Yale Jr. (1821–1868), U.S. – cylinder lock
 Linus Yale Sr. (1797–1858), U.S. – pin tumbler lock
 Shunpei Yamazaki (born 1942), Japan – patents in computer science and solid-state physics, see List of prolific inventors
 Gazi Yaşargil (born 1925), Turkey – Microneurosurgery
 Ryōichi Yazu (1878–1908), Japan – Yazu Arithmometer
 Gunpei Yokoi (1941–1997), Japan – Game Boy
 Arthur M. Young (1905–1995), U.S. – the Bell Helicopter
 Vladimir Yourkevich (1885–1964), Russia/France/U.S. – ship hull design
 Tu Youyou (born 1930), China – Artemisinin
 Sergei Yudin (1891–1954), Russia – cadaveric blood transfusion and other medical operations
 Muhammad Yunus (born 1940), Bangladesh – microcredit, microfinance
 Abu Yusuf Yaqub (c. 1274), Morocco/Spain – siege cannon
 Abraham Albert Yuzpe (born 1938), U.S. – Yuzpe regimen (= form of Emergency contraception)

Z
 Abu al-Qasim al-Zahrawi (Abulcasis) (936–1013), Islamic Spain – catgut surgical suture, various surgical instruments and dental devices
 Frank Zamboni (1901–1988), U.S. – Ice resurfacer
 Giuseppe Zamboni (1776–1846), Italy – Zamboni pile (early battery)
 Ludwik Łazarz Zamenhof (1859–1917), Russia/Poland – Esperanto
 Walter Zapp (1905–2003), Latvia/Estonia/Germany – Minox (subminiature camera)
 Abū Ishāq Ibrāhīm al-Zarqālī (Arzachel) (1028–1087), Islamic Spain – almanac, equatorium, universal astrolabe
 Yevgeny Zavoisky (1907–1976), Russia – EPR spectroscopy, co-developer of NMR spectroscopy
 Nikolay Zelinsky (1861–1953), Russia – the first effective filtering coal gas mask in the world
 Ferdinand von Zeppelin (1838–1917), Germany – Zeppelin
 Frits Zernike (1888–1966), The Netherlands – Phase contrast microscope
 Tang Zhongming (1897–1980), China – internal combustion engine powered by charcoal
 Jian Zhou (1957–1999), together with Ian Hector Frazer (1953–), China/U.S. – HPV vaccine against cervical cancer
 Nikolai Zhukovsky (1847–1921), Russia – an early wind tunnel, co-developer of the Tsar Tank
 Karl Ziegler (1898–1973), together with Giulio Natta (1903–1979), Germany/Italy – Ziegler–Natta catalyst
 Franz Ziehl (1857–1926), together with Friedrich Neelsen (1854–1898), Germany – Ziehl–Neelsen stain (histology)
 Konrad Zuse (1910–1995), Germany – invented the first programmable general-purpose computer (Z1, Z2, Z3, Z4)
 Vasily Zvyozdochkin (1876–1956), Russia – matryoshka doll (together with Sergey Malyutin)
 Vladimir Zworykin (1889–1982), Russia/U.S. – Iconoscope, kinescope.

See also
 Creativity techniques
 List of emerging technologies
 List of prolific inventors
 Ten Japanese Great Inventors
 The heroic theory of invention and scientific development
 Timeline of historic inventions
 List of African-American inventors and scientists

References

 

sv:Alfabetisk lista över svenska uppfinnare och vetenskapsmän